Ultimatum is the second studio album by SMP, released on May 12, 1998 by Catastrophe Records. The album peaked at #19 on the CMJ RPM charts.

Reception
Aiding & Abetting compared the music of Ultimatum favorably to Devo and Ice-T and noted the stronger influence of techno music in SMP's compositions. A critic at Last Sigh Magazine commended the band's maturation as composers, saying "SMP is possibly the first band in the genre to actually present something different instead of the boring *4-on-the-floor* trademark that nearly every electro act today showcases." Sonic Boom praised the songwriting and musicianship and noted that although less abrasive than Stalemate "the true essence of SMP still remains to brutally assault you with powerful media unfriendly themes and pulse pounding music."

Track listing

Personnel
Adapted from the Ultimatum liner notes.

SMP
 Jason Bazinet – lead vocals, drums, recording, mixing
 Sean Setterberg (as Sean Ivy) – drums, recording and mixing (3, 13, 16), programming and sampler (7, 13)
 Xian Di Marris – drums, design

Production and design
 Aaron Edge – design
 Chris Hanzsek – mastering
 Jeremy Moss – bass guitar and additional vocals (3)
 Matt Sharifi – programming
 Deirdre Wehrman – photography
 Mike Wimer – additional vocals (10)

Release history

References

External links 
 Ultimatum at iTunes
 

1998 albums
SMP (band) albums